The National Institutional Junta was a legislative assembly established on 2 November 1822 by order of Emperor Agustín de Iturbide with the purpose of replacing the congress which he had dissolved. Iturbide declared that until a new congress could be convened, popular representation would reside within this Junta.

Its first session was held on 2 November 1822 in the San Pedro and San Pablo College, where Juan Francisco de Castañiza y González, Marquis of Castañiza, was named president of the same. Then, this Junta was in charge of several matters of immediate need and prepared a project for convening a new congress. The Junta ceased its work at the beginning of March 1823, when Agustín de Iturbide reinstated the first congress again.

List of deputies of the National Institutional Junta

References

See also 
 Provisional Political Regulation of the Mexican Empire

Mexican Empire